Dibdiba may refer to:

 Dibdiba (Jordan)
 Dibdiba (Uttar Pradesh) 
 Dibdiba (Saudi Arabia)